Thomas Cornelius Yarr (December 4, 1908 – December 24, 1941) was an American football player and coach. He played college football as a center at the University of Notre Dame, where was captain of the 1931 Notre Dame Fighting Irish football team and a consensus section to the 1931 College Football All-America Team. He then professionally for one season, in 1933, for the Chicago Cardinals of the National Football League (NFL). Yarr served as the head football coach at John Carroll University in University Heights, Ohio from 1934 to 1935, compiling a record of 6–10–2. He was inducted into the College Football Hall of Fame as a player in 1987.

Yarr was Native American of Snohomish descent. He died of a heart attack in Chicago in 1941.

Head coaching record

References

External links
 
 
 

1908 births
1941 deaths
All-American college football players
American football centers
Chicago Cardinals players
College Football Hall of Fame inductees
John Carroll Blue Streaks football coaches
Notre Dame Fighting Irish football players
People from Jefferson County, Washington
Players of American football from Washington (state)
Native American sportspeople